Scooby-Doo: Music from the Motion Picture is the soundtrack to the 2002 film Scooby-Doo. It was released on June 4, 2002, by Lava Records, Atlantic Records and WMG Soundtracks on Audio CD and Compact Cassette and contained songs of various genres. The soundtrack fared well on the Billboard charts, peaking at number 24 on the Billboard 200, number 49 on the Top R&B/Hip-Hop Albums and number 4 on the Top Soundtracks.

Track listing

Year-end charts

References 

2000s film soundtrack albums
2002 soundtrack albums
Atlantic Records soundtracks
Scooby-Doo soundtracks
Scooby-Doo (film series)